Mirzaabad or Mirzabad may refer to:
Mirzabad, East Azerbaijan
Mirzaabad, Sistan and Baluchestan, Iran
Mirzaabad, Kangavar, Kermanshah Province, Iran
Mirzaabad, Lorestan, Iran
Mirzaabad-e Khayyat, Iran
Mirzaabad, alternate name of Mashhadi Hoseyn, Lorestan Province, Iran
Mirzaabad District, Uzbekistan
Mirzabad, Ghazipur, village in Uttar Pradesh, India